Charles Ingerham Peddle (November 25, 1937 – December 15, 2019) was an American electrical engineer best known as the main designer of the MOS Technology 6502 microprocessor, the  single-board computer, and its successor, the Commodore PET personal computer, both based on the 6502.

Biography
Peddle was born in Bangor, Maine, United States on November 25, 1937. He worked in a radio station while in high school.

In 1955, Peddle joined the United States Marine Corps. He attended the University of Maine where he earned a Bachelor of Science (B.Sc.) degree in engineering physics. Afterward, he went to work for General Electric working with time-sharing systems.

In 1973, Peddle worked at Motorola on developing the 6800 processor.

Peddle recognized a market for a very low price microprocessor and began to champion such a design to complement the $300 Motorola 6800. His efforts were frustrated by Motorola management and he was told to drop the project. He then left for MOS Technology, where he headed the design of the 650x family of processors; these were made as a $25 answer to the Motorola 6800. The most famous member of the 650x series was the 6502, developed in 1975, which was priced at 15% of the cost of an Intel 8080, and was subsequently used in many commercial products, including the Apple II, Commodore PET and VIC-20, Atari 8-bit computers and arcade video games, Oric computers, and the BBC Micro from Acorn Computers.  The Atari 2600 uses the closely related 6507 CPU, the Commodore 64 uses the also closely related derivative 6510, and the Nintendo Entertainment System uses a custom ASIC which includes an altered 6502 core (with the decimal mode deleted).  The 6502 microprocessor design was also developed into the 16-bit 65816 CPU while maintaining backward compatibility, and into microcontroller versions.  The 65C02S and 65C816S, and microcontrollers based on each are still in production and available for purchase as of June 2021, over 45 years after the initial 650x introduction.

In 1980, Peddle left MOS Technology, together with Commodore Business Machines (CBM) financer Chris Fish, to found Sirius Systems Technology. There, Peddle designed the Victor 9000 personal computer.

Legacy
Peddle, along with the 6502's co-designer Bill Mensch, are regarded as personal computer pioneers, in that both the 6502 technology and business model were instrumental in helping launch the personal computer revolution. After Peddle's death, Mensch wrote in memoriam.

See also 
 Group coded recording

References

Bibliography

External links
 The Legendary Chuck Peddle, Inventor of the Personal Computer
 Video: Interview with Chuck Peddle for Scene World Magazine (2014)
 Video: An Interview with Chuck Peddle (The Amp Hour #241)
 Video: Oral History of Chuck Peddle (Interviewed by Doug Fairbairn and Stephen Diamond on 2014-06-12 in Mountain View, CA)
 Video: VCF East 4.0: History of Commodore, Pt 1: Chuck Peddle (2007)

1937 births
2019 deaths
American electrical engineers
Commodore people
Computer hardware engineers
Motorola employees
People from Bangor, Maine
Military personnel from Maine
University of Maine alumni